The Man from Music Mountain is a 1943 American Western musical film directed by Joseph Kane.

The film is also known as Texas Legionnaires.

Cast 
Roy Rogers as himself
Trigger as Trigger, Roy's Horse
Bob Nolan as Bob
Sons of the Pioneers as Musicians
Ruth Terry as Laramie Winters
Paul Kelly as Victor Marsh
Ann Gillis as Penny Winters
George Cleveland as Sheriff Hal Darcey
Pat Brady as Pat Brady, Sons of the Pioneers
Renie Riano as Christina - Housekeeper
Paul Harvey as Davis
Hank Bell as Adobe Joe Wallace
Jay Novello as Henchman Barker
Hal Taliaferro as Henchman Slade

Soundtrack 
Roy Rogers, the Sons of the Pioneers and cast - "Smiles Are Made Out of the Sunshine" (Written by Ray Gilbert and Morton Scott)
Performed by Roy Rogers and reprised by Pat Brady - "I'm Beginning to Care" (Written by Gene Autry and Fred Rose)
Performed by the Sons of the Pioneers - "Song of the Bandit" (Written by Bob Nolan)

External links 

1943 films
1943 Western (genre) films
American Western (genre) films
American black-and-white films
Republic Pictures films
Films directed by Joseph Kane
1940s English-language films
1940s American films